Possum Bottom Covered Bridge, also known as the Jackson's Ford Bridge and Hillsdale Bridge, is a historic Burr Arch Truss covered bridge located in Helt Township, Vermillion County, Indiana.  It was built in 1876, and is a single span covered timber bridge.  It measures 131 feet long and 14 feet wide.  It was moved to its present location at the Ernie Pyle Rest Park in 1972.

It was listed on the National Register of Historic Places in 1994.

See also
Brouilletts Creek Covered Bridge
Eugene Covered Bridge
Newport Covered Bridge

References

Covered bridges on the National Register of Historic Places in Indiana
Bridges completed in 1876
Transportation buildings and structures in Vermillion County, Indiana
National Register of Historic Places in Vermillion County, Indiana
Road bridges on the National Register of Historic Places in Indiana
Wooden bridges in Indiana
Burr Truss bridges in the United States
1876 establishments in Indiana